Porto-Novo (Portuguese: "New Port", ;), also known as Hogbonu and Ajashe, is the capital of Benin.

Situated on an inlet of the Gulf of Guinea, in the southeastern portion of the country, the city was originally developed as a port for the transatlantic slave trade led by the Portuguese Empire. It is Benin's second-largest city, and although it is the official capital, where the national legislature sits, the larger city of Cotonou is the seat of government, where most of the government buildings are situated and government departments operate.

Etymology
The name Porto-Novo is of Portuguese origin, literally meaning "New Port". It remains untranslated in French, the national language of Benin.

History
Porto-Novo was once a tributary of the Yoruba kingdom of Oyo, which had offered it protection from the neighbouring Fon, who were expanding their influence and power in the region. The Yoruba community in Porto-Novo today remains one of the two ethnicities aboriginal to the city. The city was originally called Ajashe (Àjàṣẹ́ in Yoruba orthography) by the Yorubas, and Hogbonu by the Gun.

Although historically the original inhabitants of the area were Yoruba speaking, there seems to have been a wave of migration from the region of Allada further west in the 1600s, which brought Te-Agbalin (or Te Agdanlin) and his group to the region of Ajashe in 1688. This new group brought with them their own language, and settled among the original Yoruba. It would appear that each ethnic group has since maintained their ethnic idenitites without one group being linguistically assimilated into the other.

In 1730, the Portuguese Eucaristo de Campos named the city "Porto-Novo" because of its resemblance to the city of Porto. It was originally developed as a port for the slave trade.

In 1861, the British, who were active in nearby Nigeria, bombarded the city, which persuaded the Kingdom of Porto-Novo to accept French protection in 1863. The neighbouring Kingdom of Dahomey objected to French involvement in the region and war broke out between the two states. In 1883, Porto-Novo was incorporated into the French "colony of Dahomey and its dependencies" and in 1900, it became Dahomey's capital city. As a consequence, a community that had previously exhibited endoglossic bilingualism now began to exhibit exoglossic bilingualism, with the addition of French to the language repertoire of the city's inhabitants. Unlike the city's earlier Gun migrants, however, the French sought to impose their language in all spheres of life and completely stamp out the use and proliferation of indigenous languages.

 
The kings of Porto-Novo continued to rule in the city, both officially and unofficially, until the death of the last king, Alohinto Gbeffa, in 1976. From 1908, the king held the title of Chef supérieur.

Many Afro-Brazilians settled in Porto-Novo following their return to Africa after emancipation in Brazil. Brazilian architecture and foods are important to the city's cultural life.

Under French colonial rule, flight across the new border to British-ruled Nigeria in order to avoid harsh taxation, military service and forced labour was common. Of note is the fact that the Nigeria-Benin southern border area arbitrarily cuts through contiguous areas of Yoruba and Egun-speaking people. A combination of the aforementioned facts, coupled with the fact that the city itself lies within the sphere of Nigerian socioeconomic influence, have given Porto-Novians a preference for some measure of bi-nationality or dual citizenship, with the necessary linguistic consequences; for example, Nigerian home video films in Yoruba with English subtitles have become popular in Porto-Novo and its suburbs.

Seat of government
Benin's parliament (Assemblée nationale) is in Porto-Novo, the official capital, but Cotonou is the seat of government and houses most of the governmental ministries.

Economy 

The region around Porto-Novo produces palm oil, cotton and kapok. Petroleum was discovered off the coast of the city in 1968 and has become an important export since the 1990s. Porto-Novo has a cement factory. The city is home to a branch of the Banque Internationale du Bénin, a major bank in Benin, and the Ouando Market.

Transport 

Porto-Novo is served by an extension of the Bénirail train system. Privately owned motorcycle taxis known as zemijan are used throughout the city.

Demographics 
Porto-Novo had an enumerated population of 264,320 in 2013. The residents are mostly Yoruba and Gun people as well as people from other parts of the country, and from neighbouring Nigeria.

Population trend:
1979: 133,168  (census)
1992: 179,138  (census)
2002: 223,552  (census)
2013: 264,320  (census)

Geography and climate 
Porto-Novo has a tropical savanna climate (Köppen Aw) with consistently hot and humid conditions and two wet seasons: a long wet season from March to July and a shorter rain season in September and October. The city’s location on the edge of the Dahomey Gap makes it much drier than would be expected so close to the equator, although it is less dry than Accra or Lomé.

Administrative divisions

 1st arrondissement
 2nd arrondissement
 3rd arrondissement
 4th arrondissement
 5th arrondissement

Culture
The Porto-Novo Museum of Ethnography contains a large collection of Yoruba masks, as well as items on the history of the city and of Benin.
King Toffa's Palace (also known as the Musée Honmé and the Royal Palace), now a museum, shows what life was like for African royalty. The palace and the surrounding district was added to the UNESCO World Heritage Tentative List on October 31, 1996 in the Cultural category.
Jardin Place Jean Bayol is a large plaza which contains a statue of the first King of Porto-Novo.
The Da Silva Museum is a museum of Beninese history. It shows what life was like for the returning Afro-Brazilians.
The palais de Gouverneur (governor's palace) is the home of the national legislature.
The  Isèbayé Foundation is a museum of Voodoo and Beninese history.

Music
Adjogan music is endemic to Porto-Novo.  The style of music is played on an alounloun, a stick with metallic rings attached which jingle in time with the beating of the stick. The alounloun is said to descend from the staff of office of King Te-Agdanlin and was traditionally played to honour the King and his ministers. The music is also played in the city's Roman Catholic churches, but the royal bird crest symbol has been replaced with a cross.

Sports
The Stade Municipal and the Stade Charles de Gaulle are the largest football stadiums in the city.

Places of worship 

Among the places of worship, Christian churches are predominant: Roman Catholic Diocese of Porto Novo (Catholic Church), Protestant Methodist Church in Benin (World Methodist Council), Celestial Church of Christ, Union of Baptist Churches of Benin (Baptist World Alliance), Living Faith Church Worldwide, Redeemed Christian Church of God, Assemblies of God. There are also Muslim mosques, most notably the Grand Mosque. There are also several Voodoo temples in the city.

Notable people
Alexis Adandé, archaeologist
Anicet Adjamossi, footballer.
Kamarou Fassassi, politician.
Romuald Hazoume, artist
Samuel Oshoffa, who founded the Celestial Church of Christ.
Claudine Talon, first lady of Benin (since 2016)
Marc Tovalou Quenum, lawyer, writer and pan-africanist.
Paulin Soumanou Vieyra, director and author

Notes

Further reading

External links 

 Official Republic of Benin tourism site for Porto-Novo
 Official Benin government website information about Porto-Novo
 porto-novo.biz
 Images of the Central Mosque of Porto-Novo
 Adjogan

 
Capitals in Africa
Communes of Benin
French West Africa
Populated coastal places in Benin
Populated places in the Ouémé Department
Cities in Yorubaland
Populated places established in the 16th century